Dendraster gibbsii is an extinct species of sand dollars of the family Dendrasteridae. Fossil of this species have been found in the Pliocene of California (United States). They reach a diameter of about 3.5 cm.

References
 Universal Biological Indexer
 Books Geology

External links
 Trifoss
 Dendraster Echinoids

Dendrasteridae
Pliocene animals
Fossils of the United States